Oreston railway station served the suburb of Oreston, Plymouth, England from 1897 to 1961 on the Turnchapel Branch.

History 
The station opened on 1 January 1897 by the London and South Western Railway. It had a siding behind the station that served Messrs F J Moore Ltd., which supplied water. It temporarily closed on 15 January 1951 due to a fuel crisis but reopened on 2 July 1951, only to closed again to passengers on 10 September 1951 and closed to goods traffic on 30 September 1961.

References

External links 

Disused railway stations in Devon
Former London and South Western Railway stations
Railway stations in Great Britain opened in 1897
Railway stations in Great Britain closed in 1951
1897 establishments in England
1961 disestablishments in England